Michael David Metelits (born 1942 in California), a career member of the American senior foreign service, served as the American ambassador to Cape Verde from 1999 to 2002.

A member of the foreign service since 1973, immediately prior to his appointment as ambassador, he served as director of the Office of Environmental Policy in the Bureau of Oceans and International Environmental and Scientific Affairs. Metelits has also served as deputy chief of mission in Luanda, Angola; political chief in Sao Paulo, Brazil; and deputy chief of mission in Maputo, Mozambique.

Metelits graduated with a Bachelor of Arts degree from Northwestern University, a Master of Science and doctor of philosophy degrees from the University of California, and a Master of Science degree from the National War College.

Publications
The Arthur Crawford Scandal: Governance, Corruption, and Indian Victims

References

Living people
American non-fiction writers
United States Foreign Service personnel
Ambassadors of the United States to Cape Verde
Northwestern University alumni
University of California alumni
National War College alumni
American male writers
1942 births
Male non-fiction writers